The Rabindranath Tagore Literary Prize is a literary honour in India conferred annually to published works of Indian authors (residing in India or abroad) in novel, short stories, poetry and drama, originally written in any of Indian official languages and dialects, but translated to English. It was founded in 2018 by US-based independent and non-profit publishing house Maitreya Publishing Foundation (MPF) as a platform for world peace, literature, art, education and human rights. The winners receive USD 10,000 as the prize money along with a Rabindranath Tagore statuette while the shortlisted authors each receive USD 500.

The 2019 Rabindranath Tagore Literary Prize in literature was awarded to Rana Dasgupta for the literary novel “Solo’’. Rabindranath Tagore Literary Prize 2019 for Social Achievement was awarded to Yohei Sasakawa, for his incredible efforts to uproot leprosy and his great contribution to world peace, and to Madame President of Taiwan, Ms. Tsai Ing-Wen and Taiwanese people, as being a Beacon of Democracy, Human Rights and Freedom.

in 2020 Rabindranath Tagore Prize for Social Achievement was conferred to His Majesty Sultan Qaboos bin Said Al Said, the late Sultan of Oman and The People of Oman, for his astounding lifelong efforts and legacy as a peacemaker, his Majesty’s velvety diplomatic mediation of complex domestic and world affairs resulting in successful peaceful resolutions and to the world-renowned dancer choreographer Sandip Soparrkar for his worldwide initiative 'Dance for a Cause' where he uses dance, music and drama to highlight various world social issues. Raj Kamal Jha was announced the winner of the Tagore Literary Prize for his novel – The City and the Sea. In 2020, it was announced that the prizes for 2021 and 2022 would be merged, due to disruptions caused by the COVID-19 pandemic.

Winners and shortlisted authors
The winners and shortlisted authors of Rabindranath Tagore Literary Prize are.

Tagore Prize for Social Achievements
It is awarded annually along with the literary award to recognise those who have made a positive and lasting impact on the society.

References 

Indian literary awards